Salisu Abubakar Maikasuwa is a Nigerian clerk that has served as the Clerk of the National Assembly of Nigeria.

Early life
Salisu Abubakar Maikasuwa born on the 4th of March, 1958 to Abubakar and Fatima Maikasuwa of the Keffi royalty.

Education
He attended Abdu Zanga Primary School, Keffi from where he got his first school leaving certificate (FSLC) in 1970. He acquired his West African School Certificate in 1975, having entered into the government secondary School Kuru in the current Plateau State in 1971.
He enrolled for the School of Basic Studies, Zaria, earned the school's basic studies certificate and promptly gained admission into the Ahmadu Bello University Zaria, acquiring his first Degree in the social sciences in 1980. He bagged master's degree in Public Administration and policy analysis, University of Jos in 1983.

Career

Awards and honours

References
Read more at http://expressng.com/2015/06/nass-clerk-salisu-maikasuwa-meet-man-who-crowned-bukola-saraki-as-senate-president/#kfBcMTI0qIvjc0Yx.99

1958 births
Living people
Ahmadu Bello University alumni
Nigerian politicians
University of Jos alumni